The Denali nameplate is used by GMC for its highest trim level on its vehicles. Vehicles with the Denali trim option carry list prices up to 47% higher than base models. Prices range from $40,240 for GMC Terrain to (as of 2016) $81,270 for a top-of-the-line Yukon XL Denali. The Denali nameplate is often used as an insignia or status symbol, and in particular is popular as a less costly alternative to the Cadillac Escalade. The Yukon Denali line typically represents 40% of Yukon sales in both units and dollars. In 2013 it sold more than 75,558 units of the Denali brand, which accounted for 20% of GMC's sales, making it one of GM's most successful sub-brands.

History

The Denali nameplate started as the top-of-the-line version of the GMC Yukon for the 1999 model year. It was also GM's first attempt to go after sales from the new-for-1998 Lincoln Navigator. At the time of its introduction General Motors decided to give Cadillac its own luxury SUV so the Denali's exterior was shared with the 1999 Cadillac Escalade, with only the front fascia and lower side body panels differing from the standard Yukon. Even though the Yukon was redesigned alongside the Chevrolet Suburban and Chevrolet Tahoe in 2000, the Denali, Escalade, and Tahoe Limited/Z71 retained their 1990s base design.

The "Denali" brand was derived from the native Alaskan Athabaskans / Koyukon people's name for the tallest mountain in North America. It is also the name of the Denali National Park and Preserve that surrounds the mountain, as well as Denali State Park.

1999–2000
When introduced in 1999, the Yukon Denali's exterior, which it later shared with the 1999 Cadillac Escalade, differed from the standard Yukon in the front fascia and lower side body panels as well as having unique 16" polished aluminum wheels and a special exhaust cutout for a right side-exiting cast exhaust tip. The interior of the Denali also featured several upgrades not available on the mainstream Yukon. These standard features included an upgraded Nuance leather interior, driver and passenger 6-way power seats with power lumbar support, front and rear heated seats, a Bose 7 speaker (including subwoofer) audio system, an in-dash cassette, single CD player. Beginning in 2000 an in-console 6-disc CD changer was added and the continuous door buzzer was changed in favor of an actual chime that would later be used in the 2001-2002 Tahoe. Zebrano woodgrain accents decorated the front doors and center console. The front and rear doors featured unique "Yukon Denali" stitching in the panels. The 99 model Yukons received no Denali badging at all and only show as Denali when the VIN is checked.

The 350 cubic inch 5.7-litre 255 horsepower (L31) V8 was the only engine offered. RPO ZM9 was standard which included Bilstein 46mm shock absorbers and 3.73 front and rear axle ratios as well as a locking rear differential. Separate coolers for the transmission and engine oil were also standard. The Denali upgrade also included GM's automatic transfer case which allowed for push button transitions from 2-wheel high to 4-wheel high to 4 wheel low or fully automatic switching from 2 wheel drive to 4 wheel drive.

2001–2006
Even though the GMC Yukon was redesigned alongside the Chevrolet Suburban and Chevrolet Tahoe in 2000, the Denali and Escalade retained their 1990s base design. It was not until 2001 that the Denali was redesigned. GMC also introduced the extended-length (Suburban-based) Yukon XL Denali. All 2001-2006 Yukon and Yukon XL Denali were built at the Janesville Assembly Plant. Embossed side body panels and chrome surrounding the headlights differentiate the Yukon Denali from the regular Yukon. 2001 also saw the introduction of the honeycomb pattern grille which now has become the hallmark of the Denali nameplate. 2001 saw the introduction of the 6.0L V8 application in the standard-size Yukon in the Denali trim for $45,000.00 which it also shared with the Cadillac Escalade. The engine produced 320 hp upon its introduction, then was upgraded to 325 hp in 2003. 2001 also introduced a new upgraded interior and new options such as 20-inch wheels.

The previous (for 2001 only) C3 model of the GMC Sierra pickup truck was renamed Denali in late 2001 as a 2002 model.  The 2002–2004 Sierra Denali was equipped standard with a 325 hp 6.0L V8, all-wheel-drive, and Quadrasteer, the 4-wheel steering system developed by General Motors.

For 2005 to 2007, "Classic body style" Sierra Denalis were equipped with a 6.0L 345 HP V8. Additionally the trucks from 2005 to 2007 (2007 being classic body style) were changed to a crew cab with a 5'8" bed and did not have Quadrasteer as the 2001-2004 Sierra Denalis had.

2007
In 2007, the GMC Yukon and Sierra lines were completely revamped with the Denali included, now with a 6.2L V8 (producing 380 HP / 417 lb/ft) in the Yukon Denali and (producing 403 HP/ 417 lb/ft) in the Sierra Denali), six-speed automatic transmissions, and many new features and options such as power folding second row seats and rear backup camera. Styling was also changed, particularly the controversial grill and headlights, which made the Yukon look much less aggressive than any previous models. The MSRP's of the 2007 models were not increased.

2008
In 2008, there were few small changes such as the gauge cluster on Sierra Denali.
2008 was the last year Janesville Assembly Plant built all Yukon / Yukon XL Denali before production was sent to Arlington Assembly.

GMC Denali XT concept (2008)

The GMC Denali XT is a concept hybrid pickup truck with unibody design using Zeta platform. The vehicle was designed by GM's Australian design studios.

It vehicle was unveiled at the 2008 Chicago Auto Show.

Although General Motors planned for a production version based on Epsilon II platform, it was reported the company cancelled the plan because the unibody design would not give much of an efficiency boost while losing capability for which buyers were willing to pay a premium.

2009
In 2009, minor changes were made to the Yukon Denali. These changes include 403HP instead of 380HP, Cooled and perforated leather seats (optional), Bluetooth Handsfree calling standard, and flat chrome insert/body colored bodyside moldings. Also a power tilt steering wheel is now standard. The Satellite Navigation System (optional) now has the added features of instant traffic updates, and re-routing options. Side Zone Blind Spot Alert is now optional.

2010
The GMC Acadia was added to the Denali lineup as a 2011 model.

2012
The GMC Terrain was added to the Denali lineup as a 2013 model.

2014–present
GMC unveiled its next generation Denalis, beginning with a newly redesigned Sierra pickup for the 2014 model year in 2013, followed by the launching of the 2015 Yukon and Yukon XL SUVs in February 2014.

The GMC Canyon was added to the Denali lineup as a 2017 model.

Models

References

Denali
Sport utility vehicles
Luxury vehicles
Luxury motor vehicle manufacturers